Roger Manners, 5th Earl of Rutland (6 October 1576 – 26 June 1612) was the eldest surviving son of John Manners, 4th Earl of Rutland and his wife, Elizabeth nee Charleton (d. 1595). He travelled across Europe, took part in military campaigns led by the Earl of Essex, and was a participant of Essex's rebellion against Queen Elizabeth I. He was favoured by James I, and honoured by his contemporaries as a man of great intelligence and talent. He enjoyed the friendship of some of the most prominent writers and artists of the Elizabethan age and Jacobean age. In 1603 he led an Embassy to Denmark, homeland of James' Queen Anne of Denmark.

Evidence indicates that Manners was a patron of the architect Inigo Jones and probably introduced Jones to the Court of James I and Anne of Denmark, where Jones had his impact as both on Jacobean architecture and as a designer of Court masques.

Life
He was born probably at Kirk Deighton, Yorkshire, where he was baptized on 19 November 1576.

Manners' uncle, Edward Manners, 3rd Earl of Rutland had died 14 April 1587. He passed the Earldom of Rutland and Barony of Manners to his brother, John, but the Barony de Ros went to his only child, daughter Elizabeth. The 4th Earl died less than a year later, on 24 February 1588, passing the title on to his son. This meant that Rutland's inheritance was complicated by the demands of two wills and jointures for two dowager countesses and disputes between them. Since he was 11 when his father died, he became a royal ward of Queen Elizabeth. His wardship was originally promised to Robert Dudley, 1st Earl of Leicester, but Dudley died on 4 September 1588 and Sir William Cecil, Lord Burghley, the Queen's Secretary of State and chief advisor, became his guardian. His cousin, Elizabeth Manners, had been placed in Burghley's household after the death of her father.

From late 1587, Rutland was educated under the supervision of John Jegon at Queens' College, Cambridge and later at Corpus Christi College, Cambridge. He was at Cambridge when he received the news of his father's death, and he returned home for his father's funeral, where he remained until mid-May 1588, after Burghley insisted he return to Cambridge to continue his education. Rutland received his MA on 20 February 1595, in a grand ceremony planned and managed by Robert Devereux, 2nd Earl of Essex, the Queen's then-favourite and the late Dudley's stepson.

Rutland soon became a follower of Robert Devereux, 2nd Earl of Essex. This was to cause him serious problems when he became implicated in the Essex Rebellion of 1601. Rutland was imprisoned for several months and was fined the "staggering" amount of £30000, three times more than any other conspirator. He was taken to the Tower of London but allowed to bring his own furnishings, including a suite of tapestry from the Great Chamber of Haddon Hall. In order to pay the debt he was forced to sell land, causing a major argument with his mother, who refused to accept the loss of family estates. After the accession of James I, Rutland's position improved somewhat, but remained difficult. His wife Elizabeth was humiliated in 1605 when a goldsmith had her arrested for debt.

Marriage
He married Elizabeth Sidney (d. 1612), daughter of Sir Philip Sidney and stepdaughter of Robert Devereux, 2nd Earl of Essex, on 5 March 1599. The marriage was childless, and is widely believed to have been unhappy. It has been speculated that the marriage was not consummated, possibly because Rutland had syphilis, which may also have been the cause of Rutland's rapidly declining health in his last years.

Death

He died in 1612 at the age of 35, and his titles passed to his brother, Francis Manners. In 1618–19, Gerard Johnson the elder built a tomb in St Mary the Virgin's Church at Bottesford, Leicestershire commemorating the fifth earl and his wife. Rutland's mother had previously commissioned Johnson to erect two monuments commemorating the 3rd and 4th earls in 1591.

Shakespeare authorship
In the early 20th century, Roger Manners was proposed as a candidate for the authorship of Shakespeare's literary work in the Shakespearean authorship question. His candidacy was first suggested by Burkhard Herrmann (using the pseudonym "Peter Alvor") in 1906, who argued that Rutland collaborated with the Earl of Southampton to create the works. Rutland wrote the comedies, the narrative poems and the sonnets. The theory was adopted by other writers, who dropped Southampton as a collaborator. It was most vigorously promoted by the German critic Karl Bleibtreu (1907), and later supported by a number of other authors, including Lewis Frederick Bostelmann (1909), the Belgian politician Célestin Demblon (1912) and the Russian writers Pyotr Sergeevich Porokhovshchikov (1940) and Ilya Gililov (2003).

Notes

Footnotes

Citations

References
Danushevskaya, Anna Vladimirovna. (May 2001) Ideal and Practice: Aspects of Noble Life in Late Elizabethan and Jacobean England. Doctoral thesis, Department of History, The University of Hull.
Emma, the Duchess of Rutland, with Jane Pruden. (2009) Belvoir Castle: A Thousand Years of Family Art and Architecture  London: Francis Lincoln, Limited. .
Hammer, Paul E. J. (2004) "Manners, Roger, fifth earl of Rutland (1576–1612)." Oxford Dictionary of National Biography, Oxford University Press, online edn, January 2008, accessed 23 April 2013.
Historical Manuscript Commission. (1888, reprinted 1911) The Manuscripts of His Grace the Duke of Rutland, G.C.B., Preserved at Belvoir Castle. 4 vols., 1888–1905. Vol. I. London: His Majesty's Stationery Office.
Ilya Gililov, The Shakespeare Game Or the Mystery of the Great Phoenix, Algora Publishing, 2002.

External links

05
Roger
1576 births
1612 deaths
People of the Elizabethan era
16th-century English soldiers
17th-century English soldiers
17th-century English nobility
Alumni of Queens' College, Cambridge
Lord-Lieutenants of Lincolnshire
16th-century English nobility
People from the Borough of Harrogate